Helena "Elena" Kadare (born 21 September 1943) is an Albanian screenwriter, translator and author of short stories and novels.  One of the latter, 1970's Një lindje e vështirë, is the first novel by a woman to have been published in Albania. A Woman from Tirana (1990) is the novel of Kadare's that is perhaps her most widely read.

Biography
Kadare was born in Fier, in southern Albania. She studied literature at the University of Tirana, and then worked in journalism and as an editor in the publishing industry. 

She has written numerous short stories. She also wrote the first full-length novel ever to have been published in Albanian that was the work of a woman: Një lindje e vështirë, issued in Tirana in 1970 (A Difficult Birth). Her novel Një grua nga Tirana, issued in Tirana in 1994. has been translated into French (Une femme de Tirana, 1995), Dutch (Een vrouw uit Tirana, 1996) and German (Eine Frau aus Tirana, 2009), as well as into English (A woman from Tirana).

Kadare has lived in Paris, France, with her husband, the writer Ismail Kadare, since 1990. Their daughter, Besiana Kadare, is the Albanian Ambassador to the United Nations, a Vice President of the United Nations General Assembly for its 75th session, and Albania's Ambassador to Cuba.

Works 
 Një lindje e vështirë (A Difficult Birth), novel, 1970
 Një grua nga Tirana (A Woman from Tirana), novel, 1990 
 Bashkëshortët (Spouses), novel, 2002 
 Le temps qui manque  mémoires, 2010
 Kohë e pamjaftueshme (Insufficient Time), novel, 2011 
 Një grua në Berlin: Ditar 20 prill - 22 Qershor 1945 (A Woman in Berlin - Anonymous (Diary April 20 - June 22, 1945), 2016

Gallery

See also
Albanian literature

References

Further reading
 Kadare, Helena. Kohë e pamjaftueshme, Tirana: Onufri, 2011.  (Also available in French)

External links 
Biography, by Robert Elsie
 National Library of Albania
 Works of Helena Kadare

1943 births
Living people
People from Fier
20th-century Albanian writers
21st-century Albanian writers
Albanian-language writers
Albanian women novelists
Albanian women writers
Albanian novelists
Postmodern writers
Socialist realism writers
20th-century novelists
Albanian expatriates in France
20th-century Albanian women writers
21st-century Albanian women writers